Il commissario is an Italian  crime television series.

Cast

 Massimo Dapporto: Inspector Cruciani
 Caterina Vertova: Silvia Ruggeri
 Paolo Triestino: Franco Delillo
 Marco Vivio: Luca Cruciani
 Antonia Liskova: Francesca
 Andrea Tidona: Mimmo Calò
 Tomas Arana: "The American"  
 Mattia Sbragia: Bruno Scilla

External links
 

2001 Italian television series debuts
2001 Italian television series endings
Italian crime television series
2000s Italian television series
Canale 5 original programming